Depressaria pteryxiphaga is a moth in the family Depressariidae. It was described by Clarke in 1952. It is found in North America, where it has been recorded from Wyoming and Utah.

The larvae feed on Preryxia terebinthina.

References

Moths described in 1952
Depressaria
Moths of North America